Martin Johnson (born 27 March 1963 in Leatherhead) is a British auto racing driver. He is best known for competing in the British Touring Car Championship with his own team, Boulevard Team Racing.

Career
After competing in the Renault Clio Cup between 2000 and 2006, he stepped up to the British Touring Car Championship in 2009. He competed a Vauxhall Astra Coupe prepared by his Boulevard Team Racing outfit, which was the same car that Erkut Kızılırmak campaigned in Turkey in 2008. He finished 22nd on points overall, with two championship points scored with tenth-placed finishes at Snetterton and Rockingham. Johnson returned for a second season in the BTCC for 2010.

Since 2011, Johnson has been racing the Astra in the United Arab Emirates.

Boulevard Team Racing

Boulevard Team Racing is a family-run team, managed by Johnson's father Cliff until his death in June 2010. It has established itself as a front-running team in the Renault Clio Cup over the last decade and won the drivers' and teams' title in 2004 with Paul Rivett alongside Johnson.

Personal life
Johnson lives in Alford, Lincolnshire.

Racing record

Complete British Touring Car Championship results
(key) (Races in bold indicate pole position – 1 point awarded just in first race) (Races in italics indicate fastest lap – 1 point awarded all races) (* signifies that driver lead race for at least one lap – 1 point awarded all races)

References 

Living people
English racing drivers
British Touring Car Championship drivers
People from Alford, Lincolnshire
1963 births
Renault UK Clio Cup drivers